Mimori (written: 未森) is a feminine Japanese given name. Notable people with the name include:

 (born 1964), Japanese singer-songwriter

Fictional characters:
Mimori Kiryu, character in the anime series s-CRY-ed
, character in the anime series AKB0048

Mimori (written: 三森 lit. "three forests" or 深森 lit. "beautiful forest") is also a Japanese surname. Notable people with the surname include:

 (born 1986), Japanese voice actress
 (born 1999), Japanese professional baseball Infielder

Fictional characters:
, character in the manga series Saint Tail
Togo Mimori, born Washio Sumi, a main character and Yuna’s best friend in Yuki Yuna is a Hero.

Japanese feminine given names
Japanese-language surnames